Jack Fjeldstad (24 March 1915 – 4 September 2000) was a Norwegian actor and stage producer. He was active on stage and in films for more than fifty years. He made his film debut in Det drønner gjennom dalen in 1937, and participated in more than thirty films, including the role of Jan Baalsrud in Nine Lives from 1957. He was decorated Knight, First Class of the Royal Norwegian Order of St. Olav in 1985.

Filmography

References

1915 births
2000 deaths
Male actors from Oslo
Norwegian male film actors
Norwegian male stage actors
Norwegian theatre managers and producers
20th-century Norwegian male actors